Ignácio de Loyola Brandão (born 31 July 1936) is a Brazilian writer, perhaps best known as the author of the dystopian science-fiction novel Zero; the story of Brazil in the 1960s under a totalitarian regime.  In 2008, he was awarded the Prêmio Jabuti for his novel O Menino que Vendia Palavras (The Boy who Sold Words).

Biography
His father was a railroad worker in Araraquara, where he was born and raised. In his teens, he wrote movie reviews for a trade paper called A Folha Ferroviária (The Railroad Folio). In 1956, he relocated to São Paulo, the state capital, where he worked for Ultima Hora (Last Hour), a left leaning tabloid periodical.

His first book, Depois do Sol (After the Sun, a short story collection) appeared in 1965. Despite the censorship that was imposed after the 1964 coup d'état, he was also able to publish his novel Bebel Que a Cidade Comeu (Bebel Eaten by the City) in 1968, but the more critical and controversial Zero, completed in 1969, was first published in Europe in 1974, in an Italian translation, and was banned in Brazil until 1979.

He was a guest at the DAAD Artists-in-Berlin Program during the 1981/82 season. Since 1990, he has been an editor for the Brazilian edition of Vogue magazine. In 2005, he began working for the journal O Estado de S. Paulo. In 2016, the Brazilian Academy of Letters awarded him the Prêmio Machado de Assis for his collected works. He holds seat number 37 at the Academia Paulista de Letras and was elected for the Brazilian Academy of Letters in 2019.

Awards and Recognitions
2011 São Paulo Prize for Literature — Chosen to serve as a member of the Final Jury

References

External links

Zero, a short review at nthWORD Magazine Shorts

1936 births
Living people
People from Araraquara
Brazilian people of Spanish descent
Brazilian male writers
Brazilian columnists
Brazilian science fiction writers